Poladpur-Naneghol is a small village in Raigad District, Maharashtra, India.

Demographics
The village is located in the hills of the  Sahyadri mountain range. It is 1 km from the holy river Savitri and Historic temple Shiva. The population of the village is just under 500. Falane, Gole, Dabhekar, Chandivkar, Salvi, Shelar, Renose, Varvatkar, Bawalekar, Utekar, Jangam, and Jadhav are the main families in the village.

Geography

The village has three neighborhoods called Varche, Madhale, and Khalche Awhad. Recently, Katkar wadi National Tribes which is 2 km away from the village, was attached to the village.

The Pratapgad and Javali Forest are nearby. Mahabaleshwar is also very close to the village.

Economy
The people of the village are very simple and hard working. The main occupation is farming, which is  dependent on the monsoon rains  that fall in June to September every year. The average rainfall in Naneghol and surrounding areas is approximately 5,000 to 5,500 mm from June to October every year. The main crop is rice. Other products include nachani (millet), vari (coix barbata), and vegetables for their own use. There are many mangos, jackfruit, and corinda trees around the village.

Religion and temples
Villagers believe in parampara and are Varkari followers of Jñāneśvar, Tukaram, Namdev, Janabai. Vithoba and Ganesha are the most popular deities.

There is one temple in the centre of the village. Ganesha, Hanuman, and Jñāneśvar statues are in the temple. Villagers worship for seven days in a performance called Harinam Saptah in the Krishna Paksha of the month of Mārgaśīrṣa according to the Hindu calendar.

Holi, Gaṇēśa Caturthī, Navratri, and Tulsi Vivah are the chief festivals of the village.

Facilities
The village has a primary school up to class four. After finishing their primary education, the children go to Narvir Tanaji Malusare Vidhyalaya in Devale, which is 2 km from the village.

Villages in Raigad district